Lepidium is a genus of plants in the mustard/cabbage family, Brassicaceae. The genus is widely distributed in the Americas, Africa, Asia, Europe, and Australia. It includes familiar species such as garden cress, maca, and dittander. General common names include peppercress, peppergrass, pepperweed, and pepperwort.  Some species form tumbleweeds.
The genus name Lepidium is a Greek word meaning 'small scale', which is thought to be derived from a folk medicine usage of the plant to treat leprosy, which cause small scales on the skin. Another meaning is related to the small scale-like fruit.

Diversity

There are about 175 to 220 species in the genus. 10 species are found in California.

Species include:

 Lepidium africanum
 Lepidium amelum
 Lepidium armoracia 
 Lepidium apetalum  – du xing cai (Pinyin, China)
 Lepidium arbuscula
 Lepidium aschersonii  – spiny peppercress  
 Lepidium banksii
 Lepidium barnebyanum
 Lepidium biplicatum
 Lepidium bonariense – peppercress
 Lepidium campestre – field pepperwort, field cress
 Lepidium catapycnon
 Lepidium coronopus – swine cress
 Lepidium davisii – Davis' peppergrass
 Lepidium densiflorum – common pepperweed
 Lepidium desvauxii – bushy peppercress
 Lepidium dictyotum
 Lepidium didymum
 Lepidium draba – hoary cress
 Lepidium drummondii
 Lepidium echinatum
 Lepidium ecuadoriense
 Lepidium englerianum
 Lepidium fasciculatum – bundled peppercress
 Lepidium flavum
 Lepidium flexicaule
 Lepidium foliosum – leafy peppercress
 Lepidium fremontii – desert pepperweed
 Lepidium genistoides
 Lepidium ginninderrense
 Lepidium graminifolium
 Lepidium howei-insulae – mustard & cress
 Lepidium hypenantion
 Lepidium hyssopifolium
 Lepidium heterophyllum – Smith's pepperwort, Smith's cress
 Lepidium jaredii – Jared's pepperweed
 Lepidium lasiocarpum
 Lepidium latifolium – pepperweed, dittander
 Lepidium latipes
 Lepidium lyratogynum
 Lepidium merrallii
 Lepidium meyenii (syn. L. peruvianum) – maca
 Lepidium monoplocoides – winged peppercress
 Lepidium montanum – western pepperweed, mountain pepperweed
 Lepidium nanum – dwarf pepperweed
 Lepidium nesophilum
 Lepidium nitidum – shining pepperweed
 Lepidium oblongum
 Lepidium oleraceum –  Cook's scurvy grass (near extinct)
 Lepidium oxycarpum – forked pepperweed
 Lepidium oxytrichum
 Lepidium papilliferum – slickspot peppergrass
 Lepidium papillosum – warty peppercress
 Lepidium pedicellosum
 Lepidium peregrinum
 Lepidium perfoliatum
 Lepidium peruvianum
 Lepidium phlebopetalum
 Lepidium pholidogynum
 Lepidium pinnatifidum
 Lepidium platypetalum – slender peppercress
 Lepidium pseudohyssopifolium
 Lepidium pseudoruderale
 Lepidium pseudotasmanicum
 Lepidium puberulum
 Lepidium quitense
 Lepidium rotundum – veined peppercress
 Lepidium ruderale – narrow-leaved pepperwort
 Lepidium sagittulatum
 Lepidium sativum – garden cress
 Lepidium scandens
 Lepidium squamatum
 Lepidium strictum
 Lepidium thurberi – Thurber's peppergrass, Thurber's pepperweed
 Lepidium virginicum – Virginia peppercress
 Lepidium xylodes

References

See also

External links 

 Species Profile: Hairy Whitetop (Lepidium appelianum). National Invasive Species Information Center, United States National Agricultural Library.

 
Brassicaceae genera
Tumbleweeds